Filters in topology, a subfield of mathematics, can be used to study topological spaces and define all basic topological notions such a convergence, continuity, compactness, and more. Filters, which are special families of subsets of some given set, also provide a common framework for defining various types of limits of functions such as limits from the left/right, to infinity, to a point or a set, and many others. Special types of filters called  have many useful technical properties and they may often be used in place of arbitrary filters.

Examples include neighborhood filters/bases/subbases and uniformities. Every filter is a prefilter and both are filter subbases. This establishes a relationship between filters and prefilters that may often be exploited to allow one to use whichever of these two notions is more technically convenient. There is a certain preorder on families of sets, denoted by  that helps to determine exactly when and how one notion (filter, prefilter, etc.) can or cannot be used in place of another. This preorder's importance is amplified by the fact that it also defines the notion of filter convergence, where by definition, a filter (or prefilter)   to a point if and only if  where  is that point's neighborhood filter. Consequently, subordination also plays an important role in many concepts that are related to convergence, such as cluster points and limits of functions.

Filters were introduced by Henri Cartan in 1937 and subsequently used by Bourbaki in their book  as an alternative to the similar notion of a net developed in 1922 by E. H. Moore and H. L. Smith. 
Filters can also be used to characterize the notions of sequence and net convergence. But unlike sequence and net convergence, filter convergence is defined  in terms of subsets of the topological space  and so it provides a notion of convergence that is completely intrinsic to the topological space; indeed, the category of topological spaces can be equivalently defined entirely in terms of filters. Every net induces a canonical filter and dually, every filter induces a canonical net, where this induced net (resp. induced filter) converges to a point if and only if the same is true of the original filter (resp. net). This characterization also holds for many other definitions such as cluster points. These relationships make it possible to switch between filters and nets, and they often also allow one to choose whichever of these two notions (filter or net) is more convenient for the problem at hand. 
However, assuming that "subnet" is defined using either of its most popular definitions (which are those given by Willard and by Kelley), then in general, this relationship does  extend to subordinate filters and subnets because as detailed below, there exist subordinate filters whose filter/subordinate–filter relationship cannot be described in terms of the corresponding net/subnet relationship; this issue can however be resolved by using a less commonly encountered definition of "subnet", which is that of an AA–subnet.

Thus filters/prefilters and this single preorder  provide a framework that seamlessly ties together fundamental topological concepts such as topological spaces (via neighborhood filters), neighborhood bases, convergence, various limits of functions, continuity, compactness, sequences (via sequential filters), the filter equivalent of "subsequence" (subordination), uniform spaces, and more; concepts that otherwise seem relatively disparate and whose relationships are less clear.

Motivation

Archetypical example of a filter

By definition, a neighborhood of some given point  is any subset  whose topological interior contains this point; that is, such that  Importantly, neighborhoods are  required to be open sets; those are called . 
The fundamental properties shared by neighborhood filters, which are listed below, ultimately became the definition of a "filter." 
A  is a set  of subsets of  that satisfies all of the following conditions: 

Generalizing sequence convergence by using sets − determining sequence convergence without the sequence

A  is by definition a map  from the natural numbers into the space  
The original notion of convergence in a topological space was that of a sequence converging to some given point in a space, such as a metric space. 
With metrizable spaces (or more generally first–countable spaces or Fréchet–Urysohn spaces), sequences usually suffices to characterize, or "describe", most topological properties, such as the closures of subsets or continuity of functions. 
But there are many spaces where sequences can  be used to describe even basic topological properties like closure or continuity. 
This failure of sequences was the motivation for defining notions such as nets and filters, which  fail to characterize topological properties.

Nets have their own notion of convergence, which is a direct generalization of sequence convergence.

Filters generalize sequence convergence in a different way by considering  the values of a sequence. 
Knowing only the image (sometimes called "the range")  of the sequence is not enough to characterize its convergence; multiple sets are needed. 

These sets completely determine this sequence's convergence (or non–convergence) because given any point, this sequence converges to it if and only if for every neighborhood  (of this point), there is some integer  such that  contains all of the points  This can be reworded as:

every neighborhood  must contain some set of the form  as a subset.

Or more briefly: every neighborhood must contain some tail  as a subset. 
It is this characterization that can be used with the above family of tails to determine convergence (or non–convergence) of the sequence  
By generalizing this observation, the notion of "convergence" can be extended from sequences/functions to families of sets.

The above set of tails of a sequence is in general not a filter but it does "" a filter via taking its  (which consists of all supersets of all tails). The same is true of other important families of sets such as any neighborhood basis at a given point, which in general is also not a filter but does generate a filter via its upward closure (in particular, it generates the neighborhood filter at that point).

Nets vs. filters − advantages and disadvantages

Filters and nets each have their own advantages and drawbacks and there's no reason to use one notion exclusively over the other. 
Depending on what is being proved, a proof may be made significantly easier by using one of these notions instead of the other. Both filters and nets can be used to completely characterize any given topology. 
Nets are direct generalizations of sequences and can often be used similarly to sequences, so the learning curve for nets is typically much less steep than that for filters. 
However, filters, and especially ultrafilters, have many more uses outside of topology, such as in set theory, mathematical logic, model theory (ultraproducts, for example), abstract algebra, combinatorics, dynamics, order theory, generalized convergence spaces, Cauchy spaces, and in the definition and use of hyperreal numbers.

For example, like sequences, nets can be "plugged into" other functions, where "plugging in" is just function composition. 
Theorems related to functions and function composition may then be applied to nets. 
One example is the universal property of inverse limits, which is defined in terms of composition of functions rather than sets and it is more readily applied to functions like nets than to sets like filters (a prominent example of an inverse limit is the Cartesian product). 
Filters may be awkward to use in certain situations, such as when switching between a filter on a space  and a filter on a dense subspace 

For example, if  is surjective then the   under  of an arbitrary filter or prefilter  is both easily defined and guaranteed to be a prefilter on 's domain, whereas it is less clear how to pullback (unambiguously/without choice) an arbitrary sequence (or net)  so as to obtain a sequence or net in the domain (unless  is also injective and consequently a bijection, which is a stringent requirement). Similarly, the intersection of any collection of filters is once again a filter whereas it is not clear what this could mean for sequences or nets. 
Because filters are composed of subsets of the very topological space  that is under consideration, topological set operations (such as closure or interior) may be applied to the sets that constitute the filter. 
Taking the closure of all the sets in a filter is sometimes useful in functional analysis for instance. 
Theorems and results about images or preimages of sets under a function may also be applied to the sets that constitute a filter; an example of such a result might be one of continuity's characterizations in terms of preimages of open/closed sets or in terms of the interior/closure operators. 
Special types of filters called  have many useful properties that can significantly help in proving results. 
One downside of nets is their dependence on the directed sets that constitute their domains, which in general may be entirely unrelated to the space  In fact, the class of nets in a given set  is too large to even be a set (it is a proper class); this is because nets in  can have domains of  cardinality. 

Preliminaries, notation, and basic notions

In this article, upper case Roman letters like  denote sets (but not families unless indicated otherwise) and  will denote the power set of  A subset of a power set is called  (or simply) where it is  if it is a subset of  Families of sets will be denoted by upper case calligraphy letters such as  
Whenever these assumptions are needed, then it should be assumed that  is non–empty and that  etc. are families of sets over 

The terms "prefilter" and "filter base" are synonyms and will be used interchangeably.

Warning about competing definitions and notation

There are unfortunately several terms in the theory of filters that are defined differently by different authors. 
These include some of the most important terms such as "filter." 
While different definitions of the same term usually have significant overlap, due to the very technical nature of filters (and point–set topology), these differences in definitions nevertheless often have important consequences. 
When reading mathematical literature, it is recommended that readers check how the terminology related to filters is defined by the author. 
For this reason, this article will clearly state all definitions as they are used. 
Unfortunately, not all notation related to filters is well established and some notation varies greatly across the literature (for example, the notation for the set of all prefilters on a set) so in such cases this article uses whatever notation is most self describing or easily remembered.

The theory of filters and prefilters is well developed and has a plethora of definitions and notations, many of which are now unceremoniously listed to prevent this article from becoming prolix and to allow for the easy look up of notation and definitions. 
Their important properties are described later.

Sets operations

Throughout,  is a map.

Topology notation

Denote the set of all topologies on a set  

If  then 

Nets and their tails

A  is a map from a non–empty directed set into  
The notation  will be used to denote a net with domain  

Warning about using strict comparison

If  is a net and  then it is possible for the set  which is called , to be empty (for example, this happens if  is an upper bound of the directed set ). 
In this case, the family  would contain the empty set, which would prevent it from being a prefilter (defined later). 

Filters and prefilters

The following is a list of properties that a family  of sets may possess and they form the defining properties of filters, prefilters, and filter subbases. Whenever it is necessary, it should be assumed that 

Many of the properties of  defined above and below, such as "proper" and "directed downward," do not depend on  so mentioning the set  is optional when using such terms. Definitions involving being "upward closed in " such as that of "filter on " do depend on  so the set  should be mentioned if it is not clear from context.

Basic examples

Named examples

The dual ideal  is also called  (despite not actually being a filter). It is the only dual ideal on  that is not a filter on 

 is an  if  for some sequence of points 

The filter of tails generated by a sequence that is not eventually constant is necessarily  an ultrafilter. Every principal filter on a countable set is sequential as is every cofinite filter on a countably infinite set. The intersection of finitely many sequential filters is again sequential.

By definition, the infimum is the finest/largest (relative to ) filter contained as a subset of each member of  

Let  and let  
This dual ideal is  where  is the –system generated by  

Let  and let  
If it exists then necessarily  (as defined above) and  will also be equal to the intersection of all filters on  containing  
This supremum of  exists if and only if the dual ideal  is a filter on  
The least upper bound of a family of filters  may fail to be a filter. Indeed, if  contains at least 2 distinct elements then there exist filters  for which there does  exist a filter  that contains both  
If  is not a filter subbase then the supremum of  does not exist and the same is true of its supremum in  but their supremum in the set of all dual ideals on  will exist (it being the degenerate filter ).
 If  are prefilters (resp. filters on ) then  is a prefilter (resp. a filter) if and only if it is non–degenerate (or said differently, if and only if  mesh), in which case it is  coarsest prefilters (resp.  coarsest filter) on  that is finer (with respect to ) than both  this means that if  is any prefilter (resp. any filter) such that  then necessarily  in which case it is denoted by 

Other examples

Let  and let  which makes  a prefilter and a filter subbase that is not closed under finite intersections.

Let  be a topological space,  and define  where  is necessarily finer than  If  is non–empty (resp. non–degenerate, a filter subbase, a prefilter, closed under finite unions) then the same is true of   If  is a filter on  then  is a prefilter but not necessarily a filter on  although  is a filter on  equivalent to 

The set  of all dense open subsets of a (non–empty) topological space  is a proper –system and so also a prefilter.

Ultrafilters

There are many other characterizations of "ultrafilter" and "ultra prefilter," which are listed in the article on ultrafilters. Important properties of ultrafilters are also described in that article.

The ultrafilter lemma

The following important theorem is due to Alfred Tarski (1930).

A consequence of the ultrafilter lemma is that every filter is equal to the intersection of all ultrafilters containing it. 
Assuming the axioms of Zermelo–Fraenkel (ZF), the ultrafilter lemma follows from the Axiom of choice (in particular from Zorn's lemma) but is strictly weaker than it. The ultrafilter lemma implies the Axiom of choice for finite sets. If  dealing with Hausdorff spaces, then most basic results (as encountered in introductory courses) in Topology (such as Tychonoff's theorem for compact Hausdorff spaces and the Alexander subbase theorem) and in functional analysis (such as the Hahn–Banach theorem) can be proven using only the ultrafilter lemma; the full strength of the axiom of choice might not be needed.

Kernels

The kernel is useful in classifying properties of prefilters and other families of sets.

If  then  and this set is also equal to the kernel of the –system that is generated by  
In particular, if  is a filter subbase then the kernels of all of the following sets are equal: 

If  is a map then  
Equivalent families have equal kernels. 
Two principal families are equivalent if and only if their kernels are equal.

Classifying families by their kernels

If  is a principal filter on  then  and 
 

In particular,  is a filter subbase if  is countable (for example,  the primes), a meager set in  a set of finite measure, or a bounded subset of  If  is a singleton set then  is a subbase for the Fréchet filter on

Characterizing fixed ultra prefilters

Every principal prefilter is fixed, so a principal prefilter  is ultra if and only if  is a singleton set.

Every filter on  that is principal at a single point is an ultrafilter, and if in addition  is finite, then there are no ultrafilters on  other than these.

The next theorem shows that every ultrafilter falls into one of two categories: either it is free or else it is a principal filter generated by a single point.

Finer/coarser, subordination, and meshing

The preorder  that is defined below is of fundamental importance for the use of prefilters (and filters) in topology. For instance, this preorder is used to define the prefilter equivalent of "subsequence", where "" can be interpreted as " is a subsequence of " (so "subordinate to" is the prefilter equivalent of "subsequence of"). It is also used to define prefilter convergence in a topological space. 

 

Stated in plain English, the prefilter of tails of a subsequence is always subordinate to that of the original sequence. 
To see this, let  be arbitrary (or equivalently, let  be arbitrary) and it remains to show that this set contains some  
For the set  to contain  it is sufficient to have  
Since  are strictly increasing integers, there exists  such that  and so  holds, as desired. 
Consequently,  

For another example, if  is any family then  always holds and furthermore, 

A non-empty family that is coarser than a filter subbase must itself be a filter subbase. 
Every filter subbase is coarser than both the –system that it generates and the filter that it generates.

If  are families such that  the family  is ultra, and  then  is necessarily ultra. It follows that any family that is equivalent to an ultra family will necessarily  ultra. In particular, if  is a prefilter then either both  and the filter  it generates are ultra or neither one is ultra. 

The relation  is reflexive and transitive, which makes it into a preorder on  
The relation  is antisymmetric but if  has more than one point then it is  symmetric.

Equivalent families of sets

Every equivalence class other than  contains a unique representative (that is, element of the equivalence class) that is upward closed in 

Properties preserved between equivalent families

Let  be arbitrary and let  be any family of sets.
Not empty
Proper (that is,  is not an element)
 Moreover, any two degenerate families are necessarily equivalent.
Filter subbase
Prefilter
Free
Principal
Ultra
Is equal to the trivial filter 
 In words, this means that the only subset of  that is equivalent to the trivial filter  the trivial filter. In general, this conclusion of equality does not extend to non−trivial filters (one exception is when both families are filters).
Meshes with 
Is finer than 
Is coarser than 
Is equivalent to 

Missing from the above list is the word "filter" because this property is  preserved by equivalence. 
However, if  are filters on  then they are equivalent if and only if they are equal; this characterization does  extend to prefilters.

Equivalence of prefilters and filter subbases

If  is a prefilter on  then the following families are always equivalent to each other:
;

In particular, every prefilter is equivalent to the filter that it generates. 
By transitivity, two prefilters are equivalent if and only if they generate the same filter. 
Said differently, every equivalence class of prefilters contains exactly one representative that is a filter. 
In this way, filters can be considered as just being distinguished elements of these equivalence classes of prefilters.

A filter subbase that is  also a prefilter can be equivalent to the prefilter (or filter) that it generates. 
In contrast, every prefilter is equivalent to the filter that it generates. 
This is why prefilters can, by and large, be used interchangeably with the filters that they generate while filter subbases cannot.

Set theoretic properties and constructions relevant to topology

Trace and meshing

The trace is always finer than the original family; that is, 
If  is ultra and if  mesh then the trace  is ultra. 

When prefilters mesh

Given non–empty families  the family

satisfies  and  
If  is proper (resp. a prefilter, a filter subbase) then this is also true of both  
In this case,  is a prefilter (resp. filter subbase) if and only if this is true of both  
Said differently, if  are prefilters then they mesh if and only if  is a prefilter. 
Generalizing gives a well known characterization of "mesh" entirely in terms of subordination (that is):

Two prefilters (resp. filter subbases)  mesh if and only if there exists a prefilter (resp. filter subbase)  such that  and 

If the least upper bound of two filters  exists in  then this least upper bound is equal to

Images and preimages under functions

Throughout,  will be maps between non–empty sets.

Images of prefilters

Let  Many of the properties that  may have are preserved under images of maps; notable exceptions include being upward closed, being closed under finite intersections, and being a filter, which are not necessarily preserved.

ultra, ultrafilter, filter, prefilter, filter subbase, dual ideal, upward closed, proper/non–degenerate, ideal, closed under finite unions, downward closed, directed upward. 
Moreover, if  is a prefilter then so are both  
The image under a map  of an ultra set  is again ultra and if  is an ultra prefilter then so is 

If  is a filter then  is a filter on the range  but it is a filter on the codomain  if and only if  is surjective. 

Preimages of prefilters

Let  
Under the assumption that  is surjective:

 is a prefilter (resp. filter subbase, –system, closed under finite unions, proper) if and only if this is true of 

However, if  is an ultrafilter on  then even if  is surjective (which would make  a prefilter), it is nevertheless still possible for the prefilter  to be neither ultra nor a filter on  

and consequently also:

For example:

 is a prefilter (resp. filter subbase, –system, proper) if and only if this is true of 

In this way, the case where  is not (necessarily) surjective can be reduced down to the case of a surjective function (which is a case that was described at the start of this subsection).

Even if  is an ultrafilter on  if  is not surjective then it is nevertheless possible that  which would make  degenerate as well. The next characterization shows that degeneracy is the only obstacle. If  is a prefilter then the following are equivalent:

 is a prefilter;
 is a prefilter;
;
 meshes with 

and moreover, if  is a prefilter then so is 

Subordination is preserved by images and preimages

The relation  is preserved under both images and preimages of families of sets. 
This means that for  families  

Moreover, the following relations always hold for  family of sets : 

 
where equality will hold if  is surjective. 
Furthermore,

If  then 

and  where equality will hold if  is injective.

Products of prefilters

denote the canonical projection. 
Let  be non−empty families, also indexed by  such that  for each  
The  of the families  is defined identically to how the basic open subsets of the product topology are defined (had all of these  been topologies). That is, both the notations 

denote the family of all cylinder subsets  such that  for all but finitely many  and where  for any one of these finitely many exceptions (that is, for any  such that  necessarily ). 
When every  is a filter subbase then the family  is a filter subbase for the filter on  generated by  
 
for every  
However,  may fail to be a filter on  even if every  is a filter on

Convergence, limits, and cluster points

Throughout,  is a topological space.

Prefilters vs. filters

With respect to maps and subsets, the property of being a prefilter is in general more well behaved and better preserved than the property of being a filter. For instance, the image of a prefilter under some map is again a prefilter; but the image of a filter under a non–surjective map is  a filter on the codomain, although it will be a prefilter. The situation is the same with preimages under non–injective maps (even if the map is surjective). If  is a proper subset then any filter on  will not be a filter on  although it will be a prefilter.

One advantage that filters have is that they are distinguished representatives of their equivalence class (relative to ), meaning that any equivalence class of prefilters contains a unique filter. This property may be useful when dealing with equivalence classes of prefilters (for instance, they are useful in the construction of completions of uniform spaces via Cauchy filters). The many properties that characterize ultrafilters are also often useful. They are used to, for example, construct the Stone–Čech compactification. The use of ultrafilters generally requires that the ultrafilter lemma be assumed. But in the many fields where the axiom of choice (or the Hahn–Banach theorem) is assumed, the ultrafilter lemma necessarily holds and does not require an addition assumption.

A note on intuition

Suppose that  is a non–principal filter on an infinite set   has one "upward" property (that of being closed upward) and one "downward" property (that of being directed downward). 
Thus when it comes to limiting behavior (which is a topic central to the field of topology), going "upward" leads to a dead end, while going "downward" is typically fruitful. So to gain understanding and intuition about how filters (and prefilter) relate to concepts in topology, the "downward" property is usually the one to concentrate on. This is also why so many topological properties can be described by using only prefilters, rather than requiring filters (which only differ from prefilters in that they are also upward closed). 
The "upward" property of filters is less important for topological intuition but it is sometimes useful to have for technical reasons. For example, with respect to  every filter subbase is contained in a unique smallest filter but there may not exist a unique smallest prefilter containing it.

Limits and convergence

Examples

If  is Euclidean space and  denotes the Euclidean norm (which is the distance from the origin, defined as usual), then all of the following families converge to the origin:

 the prefilter  of all open balls centered at the origin, where  
 the prefilter  of all closed balls centered at the origin, where  This prefilter is equivalent to the one above.
 the prefilter  where  is a union of spheres  centered at the origin having progressively smaller radii. This family consists of the sets  as  ranges over the positive integers.
 Drawing or imagining any one of these sequences of sets when  has dimension  suggests that intuitively, these sets "should" converge to the origin (and indeed they do). This is the intuition that the above definition of a "convergent prefilter" make rigorous.
Although  was assumed to be the Euclidean norm, the example above remains valid for any other norm on  

However, not every fixed prefilter converges to its kernel. For instance, the fixed prefilter  also has kernel  but does not converges (in ) to it.

The free prefilter  of intervals does not converge (in ) to any point, and it converges to a subset  if and only if  (that is, if and only if the set contains some interval of the form  as a subset). 
In fact, if  is any prefilter in any topological space  then for every   in particular, every prefilter converges to the set  

For any point or subset  its neighborhood filter  always converges to  More generally, any neighborhood basis at  converges to  
In any topological space, a family converges to a point  if and only if it converges to the singleton set  When a space carries the indiscrete topology then every non-empty family converges to every non-empty subset (and thus also to every point since singleton sets are non-empty). 
A point  is always a limit point of the principle ultra prefilter  and of the ultrafilter that it generates.
The empty family  does not converge to any point nor to any set. Because the empty set is always an open neighborhood of itself, a family  converges to  if and only if  Thus no filter, prefilter, or other non-degenerate family can converge to the empty set.

If  is a non-empty subset then  and consequently, if  for all  then  
Applying this to  this says that if a family  has at least one limit point, then it converges to its set of limit points:  

Basic properties

If  converges to a point or subset then the same is true of any family finer than  
This has many important consequences. 
One consequence is that the limit points of a family  are the same as the limit points of its upward closure:  
In particular, the limit points of a prefilter are the same as the limit points of the filter that it generates. 
Another consequence is that if a family converges to a point (or subset) then the same is true of the family's trace/restriction to any given subset of 
If  is a prefilter and  then  converges to a point (or subset) of  if and only if this is true of the trace 
If a filter subbase converges to a point or subset then do the filter and the -system that it generates, although the converse is not guaranteed.

Given  the following are equivalent for a prefilter 
 converges to 
 converges to the set 
 converges to 
There exists a family equivalent to  that converges to 

Because subordination is transitive, if  and moreover, for every  both  and the maximal/ultrafilter  converge to  Thus every topological space  induces a canonical convergence  defined by  
At the other extreme, the neighborhood filter  is the smallest (that is, coarsest) filter on  that converges to  that is, any filter converging to  must contain  as a subset. Said differently, the family of filters that converge to  consists exactly of those filter on  that contain  as a subset. 
Consequently, the finer the topology on  then the  prefilters exist that have any limit points in

Cluster points

A family  is said to  a point or subset  of  if it meshes with the neighborhood filter of  that is, if  Explicitly, this means that  and every neighborhood  of  

When  is a prefilter then the definition of " mesh" can be characterized entirely in terms of the subordination preorder 

Two equivalent families of sets have the exact same limit points and also the same cluster points. No matter the topology, for every  both  and the principal ultrafilter  cluster at  
If  clusters to a point or subset then the same is true of any family coarser than  Consequently, the cluster points of a family  are the same as the cluster points of its upward closure:  
In particular, the cluster points of a prefilter are the same as the cluster points of the filter that it generates. 

Given  the following are equivalent for a prefilter : 
 clusters at 
 clusters at the set 
The family  generated by  clusters at 
There exists a family equivalent to  that clusters at 

 for every neighborhood  of 
 If  is a filter on  then  for every neighborhood 
 This is the filter equivalent of " is a cluster point of a sequence if and only if there exists a subsequence converging to 
 In particular, if  is a cluster point of a prefilter  then  is a prefilter subordinate to  that converges to 

The set  of all cluster points of a prefilter  satisfies

Consequently, the set  of all cluster points of  prefilter  is a closed subset of  This also justifies the notation  for the set of cluster points. 
In particular, if  is non-empty (so that  is a prefilter) then  since both sides are equal to

Properties and relationships

Just like sequences and nets, it is possible for a prefilter on a topological space of infinite cardinality to not have  cluster points or limit points.

Equivalent families and subordination

Any two equivalent families  can be used  in the definitions of "limit of" and "cluster at" because their equivalency guarantees that  if and only if  and also that  if and only if  
In essence, the preorder  is incapable of distinguishing between equivalent families. 
Given two prefilters, whether or not they mesh can be characterized entirely in terms of subordination. 
Thus the two most fundamental concepts related to (pre)filters to Topology (that is, limit and cluster points) can both be defined  in terms of the subordination relation. This is why the preorder  is of such great importance in applying (pre)filters to Topology.

Limit and cluster point relationships and sufficient conditions

Every limit point of a non-degenerate family  is also a cluster point; in symbols: 

This is because if  is a limit point of  then  mesh, which makes  a cluster point of  But in general, a cluster point need not be a limit point. For instance, every point in any given non-empty subset  is a cluster point of the principle prefilter  (no matter what topology is on ) but if  is Hausdorff and  has more than one point then this prefilter has no limit points; the same is true of the filter  that this prefilter generates. 

However, every cluster point of an  prefilter is a limit point. Consequently, the limit points of an  prefilter  are the same as its cluster points:  that is to say, a given point is a cluster point of an ultra prefilter  if and only if  converges to that point. 
Although a cluster point of a filter need not be a limit point, there will always exist a finer filter that does converge to it; in particular, if  clusters at  then  is a filter subbase whose generated filter converges to  

If  is a cluster point of a prefilter  then  is a prefilter subordinate to  that converges to 

Primitive sets

A subset  is called  if it is the set of limit points of some ultrafilter (or equivalently, some ultra prefilter).
For example, every closed singleton subset is primitive. The image of a primitive subset of  under a continuous map  is contained in a primitive subset of 

Assume that  are two primitive subset of  
If  is an open subset of  that intersects  then  for any ultrafilter  such that  

Other results

If  is a complete lattice then:
  is a convergent prefilter if and only if its limit inferior and limit superior agree; in this case, the value on which they agree is the limit of the prefilter.

Limits of functions defined as limits of prefilters

The definition of a convergent net is a special case of the above definition of a limit of a function. 
Specifically, if  is a net then

The table below shows how various types of limits encountered in analysis and topology can be defined in terms of the convergence of images (under ) of particular prefilters on the domain  
This shows that prefilters provide a general framework into which many of the various definitions of limits fit. 
The limits in the left–most column are defined in their usual way with their obvious definitions.

Throughout, let  be a map between topological spaces,  
If  is Hausdorff then all arrows  in the table may be replaced with equal signs  and  may be replaced with 

By defining different prefilters, many other notions of limits can be defined; for example, 

Divergence to infinity

Divergence of a real-valued function to infinity can be defined/characterized by using the prefilters

So for example, if  then  if and only if  holds.  Similarly,  if and only if  or equivalently, if and only if 

Filters and nets

This section will describe the relationships between prefilters and nets in great detail because of how important these details are applying filters to topology − particularly in switching from utilizing nets to utilizing filters and vice verse.

Nets to prefilters

In the definitions below, the first statement is the standard definition of a limit point of a net (respectively, a cluster point of a net) and it is gradually reworded until the corresponding filter concept is reached.

Prefilters to nets

A  is a pair  consisting of a non–empty set  and an element  
For any family  let 

Define a canonical preorder  on pointed sets by declaring 

There is a canonical map  defined by  

Although  is not, in general, a partially ordered set, it is a directed set if (and only if)  is a prefilter. 
So the most immediate choice for the definition of "the net in  induced by a prefilter " is the assignment  from  into 

This would not necessarily be true had  been defined on a proper subset of  

Partially ordered net

The domain of the canonical net  is in general not partially ordered. However, in 1955 Bruns and Schmidt discovered a construction (detailed here: Filter (set theory)#Partially ordered net) that allows for the canonical net to have a domain that is both partially ordered and directed; this was independently rediscovered by Albert Wilansky in 1970. 
If can further be assumed that the partially ordered domain is also a dense order.

Subordinate filters and subnets

The notion of " is subordinate to " (written ) is for filters and prefilters what " is a subsequence of " is for sequences. 
If  is a net in a topological space  and if  is the neighborhood filter at a point  then 

Subordination analogs of results involving subsequences

The following results are the prefilter analogs of statements involving subsequences. The condition "" which is also written  is the analog of " is a subsequence of " So "finer than" and "subordinate to" is the prefilter analog of "subsequence of." Some people prefer saying "subordinate to" instead of "finer than" because it is more reminiscent of "subsequence of."

Non–equivalence of subnets and subordinate filters

A subset is eventual if and only if its complement is not frequent (which is termed ). 
A map  between two preordered sets is  if whenever  satisfy  then 

Subnets in the sense of Willard and subnets in the sense of Kelley are the most commonly used definitions of "subnet." 
The first definition of a subnet was introduced by John L. Kelley in 1955. 
Stephen Willard introduced his own variant of Kelley's definition of subnet in 1970. 
AA–subnets were introduced independently by Smiley (1957), Aarnes and Andenaes (1972), and Murdeshwar (1983); AA–subnets were studied in great detail by Aarnes and Andenaes but they are not often used.

Kelley did not require the map  to be order preserving while the definition of an AA–subnet does away entirely with any map between the two nets' domains and instead focuses entirely on  − the nets' common codomain. 
Every Willard–subnet is a Kelley–subnet and both are AA–subnets. 
In particular, if  is a Willard–subnet or a Kelley–subnet of  then  

AA–subnets have a defining characterization that immediately shows that they are fully interchangeable with sub(ordinate)filters. 
Explicitly, what is meant is that the following statement is true for AA–subnets:

If  are prefilters then  if and only if  is an AA–subnet of 

If "AA–subnet" is replaced by "Willard–subnet" or "Kelley–subnet" then the above statement becomes . In particular, as this counter-example demonstrates, the problem is that the following statement is in general false:

 statement: If  are prefilters such that  is a Kelley–subnet of 

Since every Willard–subnet is a Kelley–subnet, this statement remains false if the word "Kelley–subnet" is replaced with "Willard–subnet". 

If "subnet" is defined to mean Willard–subnet or Kelley–subnet then nets and filters are not completely interchangeable because there exists a filter–sub(ordinate)filter relationships that cannot be expressed in terms of a net–subnet relationship between the two induced nets. In particular, the problem is that Kelley–subnets and Willard–subnets are  fully interchangeable with subordinate filters. If the notion of "subnet" is not used or if "subnet" is defined to mean AA–subnet, then this ceases to be a problem and so it becomes correct to say that nets and filters are interchangeable. Despite the fact that AA–subnets do not have the problem that Willard and Kelley subnets have, they are not widely used or known about.

Topologies and prefilters

Throughout,  is a topological space.

Examples of relationships between filters and topologies

Bases and prefilters

Neighborhood filters

The archetypical example of a filter is the set of all neighborhoods of a point in a topological space. 
Any neighborhood basis of a point in (or of a subset of) a topological space is a prefilter. In fact, the definition of a neighborhood base can be equivalently restated as: "a neighborhood base is any prefilter that is equivalent the neighborhood filter."

Neighborhood bases at points are examples of prefilters that are fixed but may or may not be principal. 
In contrast, a topological space has the discrete topology if and only if the neighborhood filter of every point is a principal filter generated by exactly one point. 
This shows that a non–principal filter on an infinite set is not necessarily free.

The neighborhood filter of every point  in topological space  is fixed since its kernel contains  (and possibly other points if, for instance,  is not a T1 space). This is also true of any neighborhood basis at  

However, it is possible for a neighborhood filter at a point to be principal but  discrete (that is, not principal at a  point). 
If in addition the space is T1 then  so that this basis  is principal if and only if  is an open set.

Generating topologies from filters and prefilters

Suppose  is not empty (and ). If  is a filter on  then  is a topology on  but the converse is in general false. This shows that in a sense, filters are  topologies. These spaces are, in particular, examples of door spaces.

Topologies on directed sets and net convergence

The same is true of the topology  where  is the filter on  generated by   With this topology, convergent nets can be viewed as continuous functions in the following way. 
If the net  converges to  then  is necessarily continuous although in general, the converse is false (for example, consider if  is constant and not equal to ). 
But if in addition to continuity, the preimage under  of every  is not empty, then the net  will necessarily converge to  
In this way, the empty set is all that separates net convergence and continuity.

Another way in which a convergent nets can be viewed as continuous functions is, for any given  and net  to first extend the net to a new net  where  is a new symbol, by defining  for every  If  is endowed with the topology  then  (that is, the net  converges to ) if and only if  is a continuous function. Moreover,  is always a dense subset of

Topological properties and prefilters

Neighborhoods and topologies

The neighborhood filter of a nonempty subset  in a topological space  is equal to the intersection of all neighborhood filters of all points in  

Suppose  are topologies on  
However, it is possible that  while also for every filter  converges to  point of  if and only if  converges to  point of 

Closure

If  is a prefilter on a subset  then every cluster point of  belongs to 

If  is a non-empty subset, then the following are equivalent:
 is a limit point of a prefilter on  Explicitly: there exists a prefilter  such that 
 is a limit point of a filter on 
There exists a prefilter  such that 
The prefilter  meshes with the neighborhood filter  Said differently,  is a cluster point of the prefilter 

The following are equivalent:

 is a limit points of 
There exists a prefilter  such that 

Closed sets

If  is not empty then the following are equivalent:
 is a closed subset of 
If  is a prefilter on  such that  then 
If  is a prefilter on  such that  is an accumulation points of  then 
If  is such that the neighborhood filter  meshes with  then 

Hausdorffness

The following are equivalent:
 is a Hausdorff space.
Every prefilter on  converges to at most one point in 
The above statement but with the word "prefilter" replaced by any one of the following: filter, ultra prefilter, ultrafilter.

Compactness

As discussed in this article, the Ultrafilter Lemma is closely related to many important theorems involving compactness.

The following are equivalent:
 is a compact space.
Every ultrafilter on  converges to at least one point in 
 That this condition implies compactness can be proven by using only the ultrafilter lemma. That compactness implies this condition can be proven without the ultrafilter lemma (or even the axiom of choice).
The above statement but with the word "ultrafilter" replaced by "ultra prefilter".
For every filter  there exists a filter  such that  and  converges to some point of 
The above statement but with each instance of the word "filter" replaced by: prefilter.
Every filter on  has at least one cluster point in 
 That this condition is equivalent to compactness can be proven by using only the ultrafilter lemma.
The above statement but with the word "filter" replaced by "prefilter".
 That this condition is equivalent to compactness can be proven by using only the ultrafilter lemma.

If  is the set of all complements of compact subsets of a given topological space  then  is a filter on  if and only if  is  compact.

Continuity

Let  is a map between topological spaces 

Given  the following are equivalent:
 is continuous at 
Definition: For every neighborhood  of  there exists some neighborhood  of  such that 

If  is a filter on  such that  then 
The above statement but with the word "filter" replaced by "prefilter".

The following are equivalent:
 is continuous.
If  is a prefilter on  such that  then 
If  is a limit point of a prefilter  then  is a limit point of 
Any one of the above two statements but with the word "prefilter" replaced by "filter".

A subset  of a topological space  is dense in  if and only if for every  the trace  of the neighborhood filter  along  does not contain the empty set (in which case it will be a filter on ). 

Suppose  is a continuous map into a Hausdorff regular space  and that  is a dense subset of a topological space  Then  has a continuous extension  if and only if for every  the prefilter  converges to some point in  Furthermore, this continuous extension will be unique whenever it exists.

Products

Suppose  is a non–empty family of non–empty topological spaces and that is a family of prefilters where each  is a prefilter on  
Then the product  of these prefilters (defined above) is a prefilter on the product space  which as usual, is endowed with the product topology.

If  then  if and only if 

However, if  then there exist sequences  such that both of these sequences have a cluster point in  but the sequence  does  have a cluster point in 

Example application: The ultrafilter lemma along with the axioms of ZF imply Tychonoff's theorem for compact Hausdorff spaces:

Let  be compact  topological spaces. 
Assume that the ultrafilter lemma holds (because of the Hausdorff assumption, this proof does  need the full strength of the axiom of choice; the ultrafilter lemma suffices). 
Let  be given the product topology (which makes  a Hausdorff space) and for every  let  denote this product's projections. 
If  then  is compact and the proof is complete so assume  
Despite the fact that  because the axiom of choice is not assumed, the projection maps  are not guaranteed to be surjective.

Because  is compact and Hausdorff, the ultrafilter  converges to a unique limit point  (because of 's uniqueness, this definition does not require the axiom of choice). 
Let  where  satisfies  for every  
The characterization of convergence in the product topology that was given above implies that  

Examples of applications of prefilters

Uniformities and Cauchy prefilters

A uniform space is a set  equipped with a filter on  that has certain properties.
Examples of minimal Cauchy filters include the neighborhood filter  of any point  
Every convergent filter on a uniform space is Cauchy. Moreover, every cluster point of a Cauchy filter is a limit point.

Every compact uniform space is complete because any Cauchy filter has a cluster point (by compactness), which is necessarily also a limit point (since the filter is Cauchy). 

Uniform spaces were the result of attempts to generalize notions such as "uniform continuity" and "uniform convergence" that are present in metric spaces. Every topological vector space, and more generally, every topological group can be made into a uniform space in a canonical way. Every uniformity also generates a canonical induced topology. Filters and prefilters play an important role in the theory of uniform spaces. For example, the completion of a Hausdorff uniform space (even if it is not metrizable) is typically constructed by using minimal Cauchy filters. 
Nets are less ideal for this construction because their domains are extremely varied (for example, the class of all Cauchy nets is not a set); sequences cannot be used in the general case because the topology might not be metrizable, first–countable, or even sequential. 

 If  is a subset of a proper filter  then  
 If  and if each member of  intersects each member of  then 
The set of all Cauchy filters on a uniform space forms a Cauchy space. Every Cauchy space is also a convergence space. 
Unlike the category of topological spaces, the category of Cauchy spaces and Cauchy continuous maps is Cartesian closed, and contains the category of proximity spaces.

Convergence of nets of sets

There is often a personal preference of nets over filters or filters over nets. This example shows that the choice between nets and filters is not a dichotomy by combining them together.

Similarly,  is called  (resp.

The following definition generalizes that of a tail of a net of points.

 

A net  (of sets or points) is eventually contained in a set  if and only if  so  is eventually empty if and only if 

Nets of sets arise naturally when pulling back nets in a function's codomain. 
Consequently,  where this family is a prefilter if and only if  is a prefilter; similarly,  
One useful consequence of this definition is that  is a prefilter if and only if   (or for points)  meaning that for every index  there is some  such that  (where this intersection means  if  is a point instead of a set). 

Convergence and clustering

Consideration of the following bijective correspondence leads naturally to the definitions of convergence and clustering for a net of sets, which are defined analogously to the original definitions given for a net of points.

Every net of sets that is eventually empty converges to every point/subset. However, a net of sets converges to  if and only if it is eventually empty. No net of sets clusters at  If a net of sets converges to  then it will cluster at  if and only if it is not eventually empty (which implies ). 

If  is a prefilter on  then  is a (partially ordered) directed set, so that the identity map  is a net of sets in  
Every prefilter can be canonically identified with this net of sets (that is, with its identity map when the prefilter/domain is directed by ). 
In particular, information (including intuition and visualizations) about how or why a prefilter  converges to (or doesn't converge to, or clusters at, etc.) a point or set can almost immediately be obtained from information about how/why the net of sets  does the same (or vice versa). 

Applications

Some applications are now given showing how nets of sets can be used to characterize various properties. 

A map  is closed (meaning it sends closed sets to closed subset of ) if and only if whenever  then  
 In comparison,  is continuous if and only if whenever  then  
This characterization remains true if  are allowed to be sets (instead of restricted to being points) such that 

Assume  is closed and  
If  then  is in the open set  so that  implies that  is eventually empty and thus that  in  
It remains to show that  for some index  

For the converse, assume that  implies  Let  be closed and assume it is not empty.
Since  is open, were it true that  then there would exist some index  such that  which is impossible since  for every index  

 In comparison,  is continuous if and only if whenever  is a net that clusters at a point  then  clusters at  
This characterization remains true if  are allowed to be sets. 

For the non-trivial direction, suppose that  is not an open map.
Because  there exists  
But  does not clusters at  since  for every  

The alternative proof below is demonstrate how a prefilter can be used to construct a net of sets, which in turn can be used to construct a net of points. 

Because  is not a neighborhood of  the family  does not contain the empty set. 
This shows that  is a -system and that it meshes with the neighborhood filter  
In particular,  is a prefilter that clusters at  
Moreover,  because every  contains  as a subset, which proves that 

Pick  as before. 
Thus  does not cluster at  even though the prefilter  clusters at  

Conclusion using nets of sets: 
Direct the above prefilter  by  so that the identity map  becomes a net of sets. This net clusters at (respectively, converges to)  because this is true of  But because  does not cluster at  neither does the net of preimages  

Conclusion using nets of points: 
For every  pick a point  
But  does not clusters at  since  for every  

A map  is open if and only if whenever  then any closed subset of  that contains  will necessarily also contain  
 In comparison, by the closure characterization of continuity,  is continuous if and only if whenever  then any closed subset of  that contains  will necessarily also contain  
This characterization remains true if  is allowed to be a net of sets that is not eventually empty (instead of being a net of points) while  continues to be a point (such that ); the same is true of the quotient map characterization below.

If  is any subset then it is readily verified that  
This implies that a map  is open if and only if whenever  is closed in  then  is closed in 

A continuous surjection  is a quotient map if and only if whenever  then any  closed subset of  that contains  will necessarily also contain  (A set  is saturated if ) 

A subset  is closed in  if and only if for every point  and every net  of subsets of  that is not eventually empty, if  then 

The proof is essentially identical to the usual proof involving only nets of points. One direction (that whose conclusion is that  is continuous) only requires consideration of nets of points and so it is omitted.
A map  is continuous if and only if whenever  is a net of sets or points in  that clusters at (respectively, converges to) some given point or subset  of  then  clusters at (respectively, converges to)  in

Topologizing the set of prefilters

Starting with nothing more than a set  it is possible to topologize the set 

To reduce confusion, this article will adhere to the following notational conventions:
Lower case letters for elements 
Upper case letters for subsets 
Upper case calligraphy letters for subsets  (or equivalently, for elements  such as prefilters).
Upper case double–struck letters for subsets 

For every  let

where  These sets will be the basic open subsets of the Stone topology. 
If  then 

From this inclusion, it is possible to deduce all of the subset inclusions displayed below with the exception of  
For all 

It is henceforth assumed that  carries this topology and that any subset of  carries the induced subspace topology.

The following criteria can be used for checking for points of closure and neighborhoods. 
If  then:
:  belongs to the closure of  if and only if 
:  is a neighborhood of  if and only if there exists some  such that  (that is, such that for all ).

Subspace of ultrafilters

The map  is injective if and only if  (that is, a Kolmogorov space) and moreover, if  then  
For every  the surjection  is continuous, closed, and open. 
In particular, for every  topology  the map  is a topological embedding.

See also

Notes

Proofs

Citations

References

  
  
  
  
  
  
 
  
  
  
  
  
  
  
  
  
  
  
  
  
  
  
  (Provides an introductory review of filters in topology and in metric spaces.)
  
  
  
  
  
  
  
  
  

Filters
General topology